The Sixth Sense is a Thai television series produced by Cholumpi Production, based on the books of the same title. Season 1 aired from September 1 to October 14, 2012, and season 2 aired from September 29 to November 29, 2013.

The series consists of five books each featuring their own story. All five stories are shown in the television series. However, the TV series does not include all of the characters in the books.

Plot 
Five girls – Yanin, Kanna, Sukontharot, Kornrampa and Nedsithang, were all born on the same day. They each receive a unique “sixth sense” on their birthday which allows them to communicate with spirits.

Characters

Description 
 Yanin Vejnarongkul / Nin / Sis Jija
The oldest in the group, she communicates with spirits by closing her eyes and meditating. She is amiable and reliable, with a stable mind that is not easily disturbed.

 Kanna Piengmongkol / Kan
The second oldest, she always carries headphones because her sixth sense allows her to hear the voice of the spirit. She is headstrong, as a result of bullying in her childhood.

 Sukontharot / Rot
The third of the group, she is the most skilled in spiritual matters because of what she has learned from her uncle, who is a monk. She can detect the spirit's odor, so she always uses a mask to cover her nose.

 Kornrampa Saknanthavee / Kam
The fourth one, she possesses self-confidence as a result of her birth into a wealthy family. She always wears gloves even in hot weather because whenever she touches something with her bare hands, she can see the past of the thing she is touching. This makes her look strange to others. 

 Nedsithang Martthongkham / Ned
The youngest of the group, she can see spirits and as a consequence always wears sunglasses. She is somewhat naive because her family, especially her older brother, is overprotective. As a result, she often desires to do the things by herself.

 Tinn
An unskilled Thai speaker who was previously living in Kanchanaburi province. He came back to Thailand to manage a resort he inherited from his maternal grandfather. He becomes disturbed by an unknown spirit.

 Phong-in Na Viangthub / Joh
The younger brother of Pim-on, he wants to learn the truth behind her mysterious death. He hires Kanna, someone he has known since childhood, to help, but she believes that he is one of the bullies.

 Trirat Thammawat / Tri / Tide
The son of a Chinese real estate family that owns the problematic market. He comes off as an uncaring playboy, but actually is just playful and loves his family. The family believes in a shaman whom he strongly opposes, and thus he looks for someone to help him prove their support is misguided. 

 Park Joon-ji / Junlajak
The grandson of Pimpilart, a wealthy real estate owner. He is living in South Korea and comes to Thailand to make a film. He is disturbed by a spirit, even though he doesn't believe it's real. He is persuaded by the manager to get rid of it.

 Pol.Lt., Dr. Worawat / Dr. Wat
A forensic physician who works at the police hospital. He is clever, but not good a good fighter. His image suffers because he loves to riding a motorbike, something that is considered to be beneath a doctor. 

 Pol.Capt. Natthadech Martthongkham / Nat
The older, overprotective brother of Nedsithang. There was friction between him and Dr Worawat because both were interested in the same woman.

Appearances

Yarn Sue Rak

Season 1 
Yanin, the oldest in the group, can communicate with spirits by closing her eyes and meditating. She is assigned to take care of Tinn, the owner of a resort in Kanchanaburi province. Tinn faces problems caused by the spirits of her grandfather and her business rival.

Main cast 
  as Yanin Vejnarongkul / Nin / Sis Jija
 Louis Scott as Tinn
  as Kanna Piengmongkol / Kan
  as Sukontharot Thammawat / Rot
 Warintorn Panhakarn as Trirat Thammawat / Tri / Tide
 Katherine Morson as Kornrampa Saknanthavee / Kam
  as Nedsithang Martthongkham / Ned

Supporting cast 
 Santi Santivejchakul as Phong (village headman)
  as Somkid, shaman
  as Aorawan / Aunt Aorawan
  as Kumarika, little guardian angel / Golden Baby
  as Ser. Pichaiphakdee / Grandpa
  as Pennapha / Penny
 Thanayong Wongtrakul as Piyaphan, father of Penny and Prem
 Sinatchai Koosakultham as Prem
  as Somchart, lawyer

Guest cast 
 Thakrit Tawanpong as Pol.Lt., Dr. Worawat / Dr. Wat
  as Pol.Capt. Natthadech Martthongkham / Nat, older brother of Nedsithang
  as Kongfah / Kong
 Chatchai Chamniankul as Security guard of Sixth Sense company (spirit)

Season 2 
The main plot of season 2 narrates the events taking place inside Tinn's resort. Benja gets injured in an accident and has amnesia. Tinn and Yanin bring her back to the resort and meet with Mirantee, Tinn's mother, who just came back from abroad. Mirantee doesn't believe in the spirit and is not satisfied with Yanin, believing that she is a scammer.

Later, Benja does everything to gain Tinn and Mirantee's attention, which makes Mirantee love and cheer Tinn. This further developed after the arrival of Robby Kids, a businessman who wants to invest in the resort, but is actually a Somkid shaman.

Benja and Robby attempt to befriend and build Mirantee's trust for their own benefit, so Tinn and Yanin work together to prove the truth to Mirantee about the scammers.

Main cast 
  as Yanin Vejnarongkul / Nin / Sis Jija
 Louis Scott as Tinn
  as Benja
  as Kanna Piengmongkol / Kan
  as Sukontharot Thammawat / Rot
 Katherine Morson as Kornrampa Saknanthavee / Kam
  as Nedsithang Martthongkham / Ned

Supporting cast 
  as Mirantee, Tinn's mother
  as Somkid, shaman
  as Aorawan / Aunt Aorawan
  as Kumarika, little guardian angel / Golden Baby
  as Ser. Pichaiphakdee / Grandpa
 Korakot Tanaphat as Korakot / Korokodo

Guest cast 
 Warintorn Panhakarn as Trirat Thammawat / Tri / Tide
  as Phong-in Na Viangthub / Joh
  as Park Joon-ji
 Thakrit Tawanpong as Pol.Lt., Dr. Worawat / Dr. Wat
  as Pol.Capt. Natthadech Martthongkham / Nat, older brother of Nedsithang
  as Kongfah / Kong
 Chatchai Chamniankul as Security guard of Sixth Sense company (spirit)
  as Somchart, lawyer
 Santi Santivejchakul as Phong (village headman)
  as Pol.Maj.Gen. Niyom, Natthadech and Worawat's boss

Kab Dak Rak Luang

Season 2 
Kanna, the second girl who can hear the sound of the spirit, has to wear headphones all the time when she is out of the Sixth Sense company. She is assigned to get rid of the woman's spirit that is following Panyuth and that leads her to meet an old friend Joh.

Main cast 
  as Kanna Piengmongkol / Kan
  as Phong-in Na Viangthub / Joh
  as Yanin Vejnarongkul / Nin / Sis Jija
  as Kanna Piengmongkol / Kan
  as Sukontharot Thammawat / Rot
 Katherine Morson as Kornrampa Saknanthavee / Kam
  as Nedsithang Martthongkham / Ned

Supporting cast 
  as Namneung Pintuwong / Pimploy Innawong
  as Dr Panyuth Na Viengthub, Ph.D., the husband of Pim-orn and Phing-in brother-in-law
  as Cheopetch Innawong
  as Kongfah / Kong, the younger brother of Kanna
 Nicole Theriault as Pim-orn Na Viengthub, the older sister of Phong-in who has died because of the car accident
  as Jarunee, the housemaid of Na Viangthub house and being friend with Pim-orn
 Thakrit Tawanpong as Pol.Lt., Dr. Worawat / Dr. Wat
  as Pol.Capt. Natthadech Martthongkham / Nat, older brother of Nedsithang

Guest cast 
 Louis Scott as Tinn
 Warintorn Panhakarn as Trirat Thammawat / Tri / Tide
  as Park Joon-ji
  as Aorawan / Aunt Aorawan
  as Kumarika, little guardian angel / Golden Baby
  as Kanna (child)
 Chatchai Chamniankul as Security guard of Sixth Sense company (spirit)
  as Benja
  as Somkid, shaman
 Korakot Tanaphat as Korakot / Korokodo
  as Pol.Maj.Gen. Niyom, Natthadech and Worawat's boss

Lae Buang Mon Tra

Season 1 
Sukontharot, the girl who can smell the scent of the spirit, is the most skilled in spiritual matters because her uncle is a monk. She has to deal with the problems of Trirat's family that is going astray with a shaman, Somkid's doctrine.

Main cast 
  as Sukontharot Thammawat / Rot
 Warintorn Panhakarn as Trirat Thammawat / Tri / Tide
  as Yanin Vejnarongkul / Nin / Sis Jija
  as Kanna Piengmongkol / Kan
 Katherine Morson as Kornrampa Saknanthavee / Kam
  as Nedsithang Martthongkham / Ned

Supporting cast 
  as Somkid, shaman
 Anusorn Dechapanya as Mr. Jamrern Thammawat, the father of Trirat, a millionaire and an owner of Ying Jamrern market
  as Mrs. Ying Thammawat, Trirat's mother
  as Amah, the grandmother of Trirat
 Toon Hiranyasap as Sukontharot's father
  as Sukontharot's mother
  as Saowapha, Trirat's aunt
  as Kethy
 Supranee Charernpol as Thip, the mother of Kethy

Guest cast 
 Louis Scott as Tinn
 Thakrit Tawanpong as Pol.Lt., Dr. Worawat / Dr. Wat
  as Pol.Capt. Natthadech Martthongkham / Nat, older brother of Nedsithang
  as Park Joon-ji
  as Aorawan / Aunt Aorawan
  as Kumarika, little guardian angel / Golden Baby
  as Kongfah / Kong
 Chatchai Chamniankul as Security guard of Sixth Sense company (spirit)
  as Somkid's henchman
  as Pol.Maj.Gen. Niyom, Natthadech and Worawat's boss

Season 2 
Sukontharot and Trirat become a couple and have moved to live in the same house but it is occupied by a child spirit who is always angry and cries in the mysterious room. She is Trirat's younger sister, Botun, who died in the accident but has something that she is still worried about, so Sukontharot has to find what Botun wanted.

Main cast 
  as Sukontharot Thammawat / Rot
 Warintorn Panhakarn as Trirat Thammawat / Tri / Tide
  as Yanin Vejnarongkul / Nin / Sis Jija
  as Kanna Piengmongkol / Kan
 Katherine Morson as Kornrampa Saknanthavee / Kam
  as Nedsithang Martthongkham / Ned
  as Botun Thammawat

Supporting cast 
  as Kumarika, little guardian angel / Golden Baby
 Anusorn Dechapanya as Mr. Jamrern Thammawat, the father of Trirat, a millionaire and an owner of Ying Jamrern market
  as Mrs. Ying Thammawat, Trirat's mother
  as Amah, the grandmother of Trirat
 Toon Hiranyasap as Sukontharot's father
  as Sukontharot's mother
  as Saowapha, Trirat's aunt

Guest cast 
  as Kethy
 Supranee Charernpol as Thip, the mother of Kethy
 Louis Scott as Tinn
  as Phong-in Na Viangthub / Joh
  as Park Joon-ji
 Thakrit Tawanpong as Pol.Lt., Dr. Worawat / Dr. Wat
  as Pol.Capt. Natthadech Martthongkham / Nat, older brother of Nedsithang
  as Aorawan / Aunt Aorawan
  as Kongfah / Kong
 Chatchai Chamniankul as Security guard of Sixth Sense company (spirit)
  as Benja
  as Somkid, shaman
 Korakot Tanaphat as Korakot / Korokodo
  as Pol.Maj.Gen. Niyom, Natthadech and Worawat's boss

Ma Ya Roi Jai

Season 2 
Kornrampa is the rich man's daughter who always wears gloves because she can see the past of anything if she touches it. She is a big fan of Park Joon-ji, a Thai-born Korean actor who doesn't believe in the spirit. One day, he visits Thailand for a drama shooting, only to find that his only relative, Pimpilart grandmother, mysteriously died and he felt that his grandmother's spirit was around him. So he decided to be a customer of the Sixth Sense company and solve the mystery.

Main cast 
 Katherine Morson as Kornrampa Saknanthavee / Kam
  as Park Joon-ji / Junlajak
  as Yanin Vejnarongkul / Nin / Sis Jija
  as Kanna Piengmongkol / Kan
  as Sukontharot Thammawat / Rot
  as Nedsithang Martthongkham / Ned

Supporting cast 
  as Pimpilart
  as Lee Jung-kook, Joon-ji's manager
  as Kumarika, little guardian angel / Golden Baby / Aorawee's twin
  as Atithep
  as Somchai, Pimpilart's lawyer
  as Aorawee / Orn
  as Parichat / Poey, an actress who has a crush on Joon-ji
  as Kim Sung-soo, an actor

Guest cast 
 Louis Scott as Tinn
  as Phong-in Na Viangthub / Joh
 Warintorn Panhakarn as Trirat Thammawat / Tri / Tide
 Thakrit Tawanpong as Pol.Lt., Dr. Worawat / Dr. Wat
  as Pol.Capt. Natthadech Martthongkham / Nat, older brother of Nedsithang
  as Aorawan / Aunt Aorawan
  as Kongfah / Kong
 Chatchai Chamniankul as Security guard of Sixth Sense company (spirit)
  as Benja
  as Somkid, shaman
 Korakot Tanaphat as Korakot / Korokodo
  as Pol.Maj.Gen. Niyom, Natthadech and Worawat's boss

Pleao Fai Nai Sai Lom

Season 1 
Nedsithang is the most prim, naive and fearful among the fives. Her eyes can see the spirit so she always wears sunglasses in public. Furthermore, she is overprotected by her brother, Natthadech. He initially dislikes Worawat, the forensic technician, because he thinks that Worawat had taken his girlfriend away. However, all three have to work together for find the truth behind Baimon, the musical actress' death.

Main cast 
  as Nedsithang Martthongkham / Ned
 Thakrit Tawanpong as Pol.Lt., Dr. Worawat / Dr. Wat
  as Pol.Capt. Natthadech Martthongkham / Nat, older brother of Nedsithang
  as Yanin Vejnarongkul / Nin / Sis Jija
  as Kanna Piengmongkol / Kan
  as Sukontharot Thammawat / Rot
 Katherine Morson as Kornrampa Saknanthavee / Kam

Supporting cast 
 Rhatha Phongam as Monlada / Baimon / Wayo
  as Dr. Ruth
  as Larp, Ruth's servant
  as Panut, Baimon's lover
 Setthinan Kanikajiranun as Ornjira
  as Kanin, Baimon's co-worker
 Jojo Louis Myocchi as Mario, Baimon's co-worker
 Peter Louis Myocchi as Angelo, Baimon's co-worker

Guest cast 
  as Suphitcha / Peach
  as Pol.Maj.Gen. Niyom, Natthadech and Worawat's boss
 Louis Scott as Tinn
 Warintorn Panhakarn as Trirat Thammawat / Tri / Tide
  as Aorawan / Aunt Aorawan
  as Kongfah / Kong
 Chatchai Chamniankul as Security guard of Sixth Sense company (spirit)
  as Somkid, shaman
  as Somkid's henchman

Season 2 
Suphitcha, Natthadech's ex-girlfriend returns to be involved in his life. She makes him believe that she loves him but in reality, she does everything to reconcile with Worawat. When things don't turn out the way she wanted, she decides to cooperate with Benja to get rid of Nedsithang, Worawat's lover, instead.

Main cast 
  as Nedsithang Martthongkham / Ned
 Thakrit Tawanpong as Pol.Lt., Dr. Worawat / Dr. Wat
  as Pol.Capt. Natthadech Martthongkham / Nat, older brother of Nedsithang
  as Suphitcha / Peach
  as Yanin Vejnarongkul / Nin / Sis Jija
  as Kanna Piengmongkol / Kan
  as Sukontharot Thammawat / Rot
 Katherine Morson as Kornrampa Saknanthavee / Kam

Supporting cast 
 Louis Scott as Tinn
  as Phong-in Na Viangthub / Joh
 Warintorn Panhakarn as Trirat Thammawat / Tri / Tide
  as Park Joon-ji / Junlajak
  as Pol.Maj.Gen. Niyom, Natthadech and Worawat's boss
  as Benja
  as Somkid, shaman
 Korakot Tanaphat as Korakot / Korokodo

Guest cast 
  as Aorawan / Aunt Aorawan
  as Kongfah / Kong
 Chatchai Chamniankul as Security guard of Sixth Sense company (spirit)
  as Larp (spirit)

Original soundtrack

Season 1

Season 2

Awards

References 

Thai television soap operas
2012 Thai television series debuts
2012 Thai television series endings
2013 Thai television series debuts
2013 Thai television series endings
2010s Thai television series
Channel 3 (Thailand) original programming